Grazhdansky (masculine), Grazhdanskaya (feminine), or Grazhdanskoye (neuter) is the name of several rural localities in Russia:
Grazhdansky, Republic of Adygea, a khutor in Maykopsky District of the Republic of Adygea
Grazhdansky, Chelyabinsk Oblast, a settlement in Yuzhno-Stepnoy Selsoviet of Kartalinsky District of Chelyabinsk Oblast
Grazhdansky, Krasnodar Krai, a settlement in Gazyrsky Rural Okrug of Vyselkovsky District of Krasnodar Krai
Grazhdansky, Oryol Oblast, a settlement in Mokhovskoy Selsoviet of Pokrovsky District of Oryol Oblast
Grazhdansky, Samara Oblast, a settlement in Krasnoarmeysky District of Samara Oblast
Grazhdanskoye, a selo in Grazhdansky Selsoviet of Mineralovodsky District of Stavropol Krai